Brigadier-General Sir Gilbert Falkingham Clayton  (6 April 1875 – 11 September 1929) was a British Army intelligence officer and colonial administrator, who worked in several countries in the Middle East in the early 20th century.  In Egypt, during World War I as an intelligence officer, he supervised those who worked to start the Arab Revolt. In Palestine, Arabia and Mesopotamia, in the 1920s as a colonial administrator, he helped negotiate the borders of the countries that later became Israel, Jordan, Syria, Saudi Arabia and Iraq.

Early life
Born in Ryde, Isle of Wight, Clayton was the eldest son of Lt. Col. William Lewis Nicholl Clayton, and his wife, Maria Martha Pilkington. He was educated at the Isle of Wight College and the Royal Military Academy, Woolwich. He become an officer in the Royal Artillery in 1895. He was part of the forces sent to the Sudan during the closing stages of the Mahdist War, seeing action in the Battle of Atbara (1898). He then served in Egypt, but in 1910 he retired and left the army to work as private secretary to the Governor-General of Sudan, Sir Francis Reginald Wingate.

World War I
During World War I, Clayton worked in army intelligence in Cairo, Egypt, serving in the newly formed Arab Bureau. In 1914, he sent a secret memorandum to Lord Kitchener, suggesting that Britain work with the Arabs to overthrow their Ottoman rulers. He became Director of Intelligence, and was promoted Brigadier-General. In this role, he worked with many of the people that helped to trigger the Arab Revolt against the Ottoman Turks.

In Seven Pillars of Wisdom (1935), T. E. Lawrence described Clayton's role as chief of British intelligence in Egypt between 1914 and 1917:

Colonial administration
Following the war, Clayton worked as an advisor for the Egyptian government, and then in the colonial administration of the British Mandate of Palestine. He was Civil Secretary of Palestine from 1922 to 1925, at which point he was briefly acting High Commissioner. He was then involved in negotiations with Arab rulers for the Treaty of Jeddah (1927); he was an envoy to the Sultan Ibn Saud of Nejd, tasked to undertake a mission to Yemen to negotiate with its ruler Imam Yahya Muhammad Hamid ed-Din. From 1928, he was High Commissioner for the British Mandate of Mesopotamia (Iraq).  Clayton was involved in negotiations for a new Anglo-Iraqi Treaty.  His unexpected death, from a heart attack, delayed matters, but the new treaty was eventually signed in 1930.

Personal life
His younger brother, Iltyd Nicholl Clayton, was also a British Army officer.

In 1912, he married Enid Caroline Thorowgood in London, with the ceremony being conducted by Llewellyn Henry Gwynne, the Bishop of Khartoum.

They had five children, but, as the family accompanied him to his appointments, two of them died, one from pneumonic plague. His daughter Patience (later Marshall), who suffered from bubonic plague as a child, studied at Cambridge and went on to gain an OBE for her work as a magistrate and with young offenders. His son John went into medicine, becoming the doctor for Eton College and "Surgeon Apothecary to the Royal Household at Windsor", in which capacity he treated the Queen Mother when she got a fishbone stuck in her throat. in 1982. His other son, Sam, married Lady Mary Leveson-Gower, daughter of the Queen Mother's sister Rose Leveson-Gower, Countess Granville; their daughter is Rosie Stancer, polar explorer.
 
On 11 September 1929, Gilbert Clayton succumbed to the consequences of a heart attack in Baghdad at the age of 54. His widow and their three remaining children moved back to England, first to Doddington, Lincolnshire, and then to a grace and favour flat at Hampton Court.

Positions
Clayton held the following positions:
1914–1916 – Director of Military Intelligence, British Army Headquarters, Cairo
1916–1917 – Brigadier General, General Staff, Military Operations, Hejaz
1917–1919 – Chief Political Officer, Egyptian Expeditionary Force. Military Governor, Palestine (O.E.T.A. South)
1919–1922 – Adviser to the Egyptian Ministry of the Interior
1922–1925 – Civil Secretary to the Palestine Government
1925–1925 – Acting British High Commissioner for Palestine (British Mandate of Palestine)
1925–1928 – Envoy to the Sultan Ibn Saud of Nejd
1926	   – Special Envoy to Yahya ibn Muhammad Hamid ad-Din, Imam of the Yemen
1927	   – Special Envoy to Rome
1929      – British High Commissioner to the Kingdom of Iraq (British Mandate of Mesopotamia)

Honours
1914 – Third Class of the Imperial Ottoman Order of the Medjidieh 
1915 – Companion of the Order of St. Michael and St. George
1916 – Officer of the Legion of Honour
1917 – Companion of the Order of the Bath
1917 – Order of St. Stanislas, 2nd Class
1919 – Knight Commander of the Order of the British Empire
1926 – Knight Commander of the Order of St. Michael and St. George

References

Bibliography

External links
Gilbert Clayton, Jenab Tutunji, Encyclopedia of the Modern Middle East and North Africa, August 2004
Clayton, Sir Gilbert Falkingham (1875–1929), M. W. Daly, Oxford Dictionary of National Biography, September 2004
Review of 'An Arabian Diary', Jon E. Mandaville, Middle East Journal, Vol. 25, No. 1 (Winter, 1971), p. 115
Sir Gilbert Falkingham Clayton CMG CB KBE KCMG (1875–1929)  (dsthorne.com)
Photographs and portraits of Gilbert Falkingham Clayton (National Portrait Gallery)
The Clayton mission to Sana'a of 1926, including photographs (The British-Yemeni Society)
Clayton, Sir Gilbert Falkingham, Oxford Dictionary of National Biography

1875 births
1929 deaths
People from Ryde
Graduates of the Royal Military Academy, Woolwich
British Army generals of World War I
Mandatory Iraq people
British Army personnel of the Mahdist War
Companions of the Order of the Bath
Knights Commander of the Order of the British Empire
Knights Commander of the Order of St Michael and St George
Royal Artillery officers
British Army brigadiers
Military personnel from the Isle of Wight
Administrators of Palestine
British colonial governors and administrators in Asia
Arab Bureau officers